Hanoi University of Mining and Geology (HUMG) is a university in the Bắc Từ Liêm district of Hanoi, the capital of Vietnam. It trains technical experts in exploration and exploitation of natural resources; in protection of mining and the geological environment; and to be a center for research and technology transfer in geology, oil and gas, surveying, and mining. Higher education is also provided in theoretical sciences, information technology and economics and business administration.
  
HUMG has three campuses: Hanoi (main campus), Quảng Ninh, and Vũng Tàu.

Faculties
 Faculty of Mining
 Faculty of Geology
 Faculty of Information technology
 Faculty of Surveying and Mapping
Department of Cartography
Department of Photogrammetry and Remote Sensing
Department of Surveying Engineering
Department of Geodesy
Department of General surveying
Department of Mining surveying
 Faculty of Oil and Gas
 Faculty of Economics and Business Administration
 Faculty of Construction
 Faculty of Environment
 Faculty of Electromechanics

Alumni
Trần Đức Lương: president of Vietnam from 1997 to 2006
Phạm Nhật Vượng: real estate mogul, Vietnam's richest man and billionaire

References

External links

Universities in Hanoi
Educational institutions established in 1966
Buildings and structures completed in 1966
Geology education
1966 establishments in North Vietnam